Victor Atkinson (31 March 1921 – 26 April 2011) was an  Australian rules footballer who played with Hawthorn in the Victorian Football League (VFL).

Notes

External links 

1921 births
2011 deaths
Australian rules footballers from Victoria (Australia)
Hawthorn Football Club players
Box Hill Football Club players